Mesopotamia Air or Mesopotamia Airlines was a short-lived airline based in Sulaimaniyah, Iraq, operating scheduled flights  from Sulaimaniyah International Airport to Amsterdam, Frankfurt and London via Vienna. The Official General Sales Agent (GSA) in Germany was the Company Al-Iraqia Air Travel GmbH (Horus Air Travel & Cargo GmbH) located in Frankfurt/Main.

Destinations

Fleet
The Mesopotamia Air fleet consisted of the following aircraft:

References

Defunct airlines of Iraq
Airlines established in 2006
Airlines disestablished in 2008
Iraqi companies established in 2006
2008 disestablishments in Iraq
Defunct charter airlines